Mehrad Atashi (born February 25, 1986, in Rey, Iran) is an Iranian professional basketball player. He currently plays for Chemidor Qom in Iranian Basketball Super League as well as with the Iranian national basketball team, as a Guard.

National team
He was selected to play for Iran national team in 2010 World Championship held in Turkey. And also was a member of national team in 2011 FIBA Asia Championship.

Honours

National team
Asian Under-18 Championship
Gold medal: 2004

Club
Asian Championship
Gold medal: 2009, 2010 (Mahram)
West Asian Championship
Gold medal: 2009, 2010 (Mahram)
Iranian Super League
Champions: 2005 (Sanam), 2008, 2009, 2010, 2011 (Mahram)

References

1986 births
Living people
Iranian men's basketball players
Mahram Tehran BC players
Shooting guards
Sportspeople from Tehran